Chao-Pha (Tai Ahom: 𑜋𑜧𑜨 𑜇𑜡,  Jao3 Fa5,  Sawbwa) was a royal title used by the hereditary rulers of the Tai peoples of Mong Dun, Mong Shan, Mong Mao, kingdoms of Thai and Tai-Khamti people.  According to local chronicles, some fiefdoms of Chao-Pha date from as early as the 2nd century BCE; however, the earlier sections of these chronicles are generally agreed to be legendary.

Overview
During British colonial rule, there were 14 to 16 Chao-Phas at a time, each ruling a highly autonomous state, until 1922 when the Federated Shan States were formed and the Chao-Phas powers were reduced. However, they nominally kept their positions as well as their courts and still played a role in local administration until they collectively relinquished their titles in favour of the Union of Burma in 1959. Shan is the semi-independent Shan States (Muang) in what today is Eastern Myanmar (Burma). It may also be used for rulers of similar Tai/Dai states in neighbouring countries, notably including China's Yunnan Province.

Gallery

See also 
List of rulers of Shan states
Ahom Chao Pha
Chao (monarchy) 
Tusi

References

External links

Shan States
Burmese words and phrases
Ahom kingdom